Regulator of G-protein signaling 12 is a protein that in humans is encoded by the RGS12 gene.

This gene encodes a member of the 'regulator of G protein signaling' (RGS) gene family. The encoded protein may function as a guanosine triphosphatase (GTPase)-activating protein as well as a transcriptional repressor. This protein may play a role in tumorigenesis. Multiple transcript variants encoding distinct isoforms have been identified for this gene. Other alternative splice variants have been described but their biological nature has not been determined.

Interactions
RGS12 has been shown to interact with GNAI1, GNAI3, and the kappa opioid receptor.

References

Further reading